Indian Hill is a summit in Edmonson County, Kentucky, in the United States.

Indian mounds are found near Indian Hill.

References

Landforms of Edmonson County, Kentucky
Mountains of Kentucky